This is a list of sailing ships participating in Sail Amsterdam 2015.

References

External links

2015 in the Netherlands
Lists of sailing ships
Tall ships